The 2019 Louisiana–Monroe Warhawks baseball team represents the University of Louisiana at Monroe in the 2019 NCAA Division I baseball season. The Warhawks play their home games at Warhawk Field. They are under the direction of second year head coach Michael Federico.

Preseason

Sun Belt coaches poll
On January 30, 2019, the Sun Belt released their preseason coaches poll with the Warhawks predicted to finish in sixth place in the West Division.

Personnel

Coaching staff

Roster

Schedule and results
The 2019 ULM Warhawks baseball schedule was released on October 25, 2018. It features 28 games at Warhawk Field in Monroe, Louisiana, including a seven–game home stand in March. They will play 27 games against opponents who won 30 or more games in the 2018 season, and 13 games against teams who played in the NCAA Tournament last year (Army, Coastal Carolina, LSU, Mississippi State, Northwestern State, Southern Miss and Troy). They will also travel to Pensacola, Florida during the first weekend of March to play at the Pensacola Blue Wahoos baseball park.

 Rankings are based on the team's current ranking in the Collegiate Baseball poll.

References

Louisiana-Monroe
Louisiana–Monroe Warhawks baseball seasons
Louis